Felsődobsza is a village in Borsod-Abaúj-Zemplén County in northeastern Hungary. , it had a population of 978.

References

Populated places in Borsod-Abaúj-Zemplén County